Bellator 293: Golm vs. James is a mixed martial arts event produced by Bellator MMA that will take place on March 31, 2023, at the Pechanga Resort and Casino in Temecula, California, United States.

Background 
The main event of Bellator 293 will be a heavyweight match between No. 5-ranked Marcelo Golm and No. 8-ranked Daniel James.

Top-ranked Cat Zingano will face the No. 4-ranked Leah McCourt in the co-main event of the card. The main card will also include a middleweight battle between No. 4-ranked John Salter and No. 6-ranked Aaron Jeffrey and a welterweight matchup between No. 10-ranked Jaleel Willis and Rustam Khabilov, a 13-fight UFC veteran who will be making his Bellator debut.

A lightweight bout between Mandel Nallo and Jay Jay Wilson was scheduled for this event; however Wilson pulled out of the bout and was replaced by Adam Piccolotti.

Fight card

Reported payout
The following is the reported payout to the fighters as reported to the California State Athletic Commission. It is important to note the amounts do not include sponsor money, discretionary bonuses, viewership points or additional earnings.

See also 

 2023 in Bellator MMA
 List of Bellator MMA events
 List of current Bellator fighters
 Bellator MMA Rankings

References 

Events in San Jose, California
Bellator MMA events
2023 in mixed martial arts
March 2023 sports events in the United States
2023 in sports in California
Mixed martial arts in California
Sports competitions in California
Scheduled mixed martial arts events